Schorr is a lunar impact crater that lies across the eastern limb of the Moon. From the Earth this crater is viewed from the side, limiting the amount of detail that can be observed. The visibility of this crater is also affected by libration of the Moon in its orbit. The crater lies just to the northwest of the walled plain Curie, and to the east-southeast of the crater Gibbs.

When viewed from orbit, this appears as a circular crater with an outer rim that has not been significantly worn through impact erosion. The material along the inner walls has accumulated along the bottom of the sloping sides, forming a ledge along parts of the base. The interior floor is irregular in places, with low ridges crossing parts of the bottom. Schorr intrudes slightly into the satellite crater Schorr A to the southeast.

Satellite craters

By convention these features are identified on lunar maps by placing the letter on the side of the crater midpoint that is closest to Schorr.

See also 
 Asteroid 1235 Schorria

References

 
 
 
 
 
 
 
 
 
 
 
 

Impact craters on the Moon